Nikolay Igorevich Pimenov (born 29 March 1958) is a retired Russian rower who mostly competed in the coxless pairs, rowing with his twin brother Yuriy. Between 1978 and 1993 the brothers won a silver medal at the 1980 Olympics, as well as three gold, three silver and one bronze medal at the world championships. They finished in 6th and 15th place at the 1988 and 1992 Games, respectively, missing the 1984 Olympics due to their boycott by the Soviet Union.

Pimenov is the head coach of the Russian junior team and an internationally recognized painter. In 1996 he became the fifth person to receive the Thomas Keller Medal, the highest honor in rowing. After winning the 1985 world title he had to be hospitalized due to exhaustion and missed the award ceremony.

References

1958 births
Living people
Russian male rowers
Soviet male rowers
Olympic rowers of the Soviet Union
Olympic rowers of the Unified Team
Rowers at the 1980 Summer Olympics
Rowers at the 1988 Summer Olympics
Rowers at the 1992 Summer Olympics
Olympic silver medalists for the Soviet Union
Russian twins
Olympic medalists in rowing
Twin sportspeople
World Rowing Championships medalists for the Soviet Union
Medalists at the 1980 Summer Olympics
Thomas Keller Medal recipients